John Robert Coghlan (born 19 September 1946) is an English musician, best known as the original drummer of the rock band Status Quo.

Early life
The son of a Glasgow-born father and a London-born half-French mother, Coghlan grew up in Dulwich and was educated at Kingsdale Comprehensive School. He left school at 15 to begin an apprenticeship as a mechanic. He attended drumming tuition under Lloyd Ryan, who also taught Phil Collins the drum rudiments.

Career
John Coghlan joined Status Quo, then called The Scorpions (latterly The Spectres), in early 1962 after a meeting with bassist Alan Lancaster, guitarist Francis Rossi and keyboard player Jess Jaworski. "The three of them were playing away through a single Vox AC30 amplifier," he recalled. "But it sounded amazing and that was the start of it all."

Coghlan played on the first fourteen Quo albums, including their first and most successful live album, Live! in 1977, and songs such as Caroline", "Down Down", "Rockin' All Over the World" and "Whatever You Want".

Departure
While Quo were recording what became their 1+9+8+2 album, Coghlan unexpectedly quit after almost twenty years of being in the line-up. According to Francis Rossi and Rick Parfitt, Coghlan went into the studio, sat behind his kit, "tapped around" on it, "then he got up, kicked the whole kit apart, walked out and that was that."

"It had been creeping up on me," the drummer explained. "I always felt that we never got enough rest; there were parties every night… Also, things weren't happy for me at home in those days, and nobody in the band was too interested in anybody else's problems… It was such a shame, because the original band were shit-hot and we allowed it to fall apart… Alan [Lancaster] told everybody when I left the room that I'd be back the next day. In fact, I was on a plane, going home."

Coghlan was replaced by Pete Kircher, formerly of the 1960s band Honeybus.

Subsequently, Coghlan played with Partners in Crime, but the band failed to earn major attention. He also played on a one-off single by The Rockers, a supergroup also featuring Roy Wood, Phil Lynott and Chas Hodges. Their "We Are The Boys (Who Make All The Noise)", a rock and roll medley, was released in November 1983 and made No. 79 in the chart. His own band, John Coghlan's Diesel, was a loose ensemble of musicians he'd known in his years with Quo, notably Bob Young and Andy Bown. Diesel never signed a proper recording contract.

John Coghlan's Quo 
Coghlan continued to play in his own solo bands mostly known as John Coghlan's Quo, and also with members from other bands, including members from well known Quo tribute acts, including Rick Abbs (Dog of Two Head), Rick Chase and Mick Hughes  from Predatur.  He also leads the John Coghlan Band, or JCB, which comprises the members of the 12 bar boogie rock band and the King Earl Boogie Band (with former members of Mungo Jerry).

His last released song, "Lockdown", refers to the COVID-19 lockdown in the United Kingdom. Coghlan's last musical performance with John Coghlan's Quo took place in Burford, England on 14 October 2022.

Status Quo reunion
In 2012 Coghlan, along with bandmates Rick Parfitt, Francis Rossi and Alan Lancaster, reunited for a special one-off jam session at Shepperton Studios in Surrey, for the band's first ever cinematic documentary Hello Quo!, directed by Alan G. Parker. It was the first time the four had all been in the same room and played together since Coghlan left in 1981.

In October 2012, the same month as Hello Quo! was released, it was announced that the classic line-up of Status Quo were having a one-off reunion tour across the UK planned for March 2013: their first tour together in 32 years. Tickets went on sale in November and sold out in under twenty minutes. The tour consisted of nine shows, the first being at Manchester Apollo and including two back-to-back dates at Hammersmith Apollo, with the final gig at Wembley Arena on 17 March 2013. Footage was released as a Blu-ray / DVD / CD on 30 September 2013. There was another reunion tour in 2014, accompanied by further CD/DVD/Blu-ray releases.

Personal life
Coghlan has one daughter, Charlotte, from his marriage to first wife Carol. As a consequence of his life as a band member, Coghlan moved around for several years before making his home in Ballasalla, Isle of Man for ten years. Coghlan now lives in Shilton, Oxfordshire with Gillie, his second wife of more than 30 years. Gillie worked in the music business, including for the agents at MAM, NEMS and Bron, who represented bands such as Hall & Oates, Black Sabbath, Nils Lofgren, Hot Chocolate, Barclay James Harvest and Ace. Gillie has competed in, and won, many TV quiz shows over the years, including the Chase, The Weakest Link and Sale of The Century International representing England. John and Gillie featured in an episode of The Life Laundry which looked at much of his music memorabilia.

Coghlan has a love for 4-wheel drives and military vehicles (especially vintage), and the band participated in an off-roading video whilst he was with them. He is also the patron of the 'Westie ReHoming' charity which aims to find homes for West Highland White Terriers.

References

External links
John Coghlan's official site
John Coghlan's official Myspace

Status Quo (band) members
1946 births
Living people
English rock drummers
People from Dulwich
English people of Scottish descent
English people of French descent
Musicians from London
English songwriters